Laura Kavanagh, 40, is the 34th Fire Commissioner of the New York City Fire Department (FDNY), the first woman to hold the position. Appointed by mayor Eric Adams on October 27, 2022,  Kavanagh oversaw the diversification of the FDNY applicant pool, including graduating the largest group of women in nearly three decades. As a civilian, Kavanagh oversees the day-to-day operations of the largest fire department in the country with more than 17,000 employees and a 2 billion dollar budget. 

Prior to her appointment as Fire Commissioner, Kavanagh spent several years in the FDNY, acting as a key leader in the agency's response to major incidents including the Ebola outbreak of 2015 and the 2020 COVID-19 pandemic.

Early life
Kavanagh grew up near San Francisco, the only child of a public school teacher and a telephone company worker. Upon graduation from Whittier College in California with a BA in Political Science and International Relations, she moved to New York City and lived in all five boroughs, managing and campaign consulting for non-profits, community-based organizations and unions. She earned a Master of Public Administration degree from Columbia University's School for International and Public Affairs. Kavanagh completed the Executive Leaders Program at the Naval Postgraduate School’s Center for Homeland Defense and Security, and the Stanford Graduate School of Business’ Summer Institute.

Career
Kavanagh has held senior roles on Presidential, Mayoral, Congressional and local campaigns. She was a Special Assistant to Mayor Bill de Blasio, and during the 2012 United States presidential election, she served as Deputy Director in Pennsylvania on Barack Obama's reelection campaign. She joined the FDNY in 2014, first as Director of External Affairs in 2014 before her promotion as Assistant Commissioner for External Affairs several months later. In 2015, she was appointed Deputy Commissioner for Government Affairs and Special Programs, became First Deputy Commissioner in 2017 and served as acting Fire Commissioner in February of 2022 after the retirement of Fire Commissioner Daniel Nigro.

An avid runner, Commissioner Kavanagh has completed two New York City Marathons and is a regular participant in the stair climbs that honor fallen first responders and their families.

References 

Commissioners of the New York City Fire Department
Living people
Whittier College alumni
School of International and Public Affairs, Columbia University alumni
Women in New York (state) politics
1982 births